Sântana is a town in north-western Romania, in the county of Arad. Declared a town in 2003, it administers one village, Caporal Alexa (Erdőskerek).

Geography
The town is situated in the northern part of the Arad Plateau, at a  distance from the county seat, Arad. It is traversed by county roads DJ791 and DJ792C.

Population

According to the 2011 census the population of the town counts 10725 inhabitants. From an ethnic point of view it has the following structure: 84.89% are Romanians, 9.57% Roma, 3.14% Germans, 2.07% Hungarians and 0.4% are of other or undeclared nationalities. 79.6% are Romanian Orthodox, 11.5% Pentecostal, 5.5% Roman Catholic and 1.2% Baptist.

History
The first documentary record of the locality under the name Sântana goes back to the year 1828. The settlement is the result of the continuous development of Comlăuș, a locality mentioned already in 1334. Caporal Alexa was mentioned in 1334 when it was called Kerecton. Until 1926, it was called Cherechiu, which is still its colloquial name.

Natives
 Ștefan Augustin Doinaș
 Adrian Drida
 Oskar Kaufmann

Economy
Although the economy of the town is prevalent agricultural, the secondary and tertiary economic sectors have also developed recently. Sântana is an important centre of vineyards.

Tourism
Its status as a significant road and railway junction can be used also for the promotion and improvement of the tourism. The specific architecture, the historical and architectural monuments as the "Convictului" building, the copyhold house and the fortifications called "Cetatea veche" are only a few of the locality's touristic sights.

Gallery

References

Towns in Romania
Populated places in Arad County
Localities in Crișana
Former Danube Swabian communities in Romania